"Peter Klaus" is a German folk tale. The story was written as The Goatherd by Johann Karl Christoph Nachtigal, who published it in 1800 under the alias Otmar.

Plot summary
The story follows a German goatherd from a village named Sittendorf, today part of the town Kelbra. While looking for escaped goats, Peter Klaus is led to where others are playing games in the woods. After tasting their wine, he falls asleep and wakes up twenty years later.

Influence
The story was part of the inspiration for American writer Washington Irving's 1819 short story "Rip Van Winkle".

References

German folklore
Rip Van Winkle
Supernatural legends
Legendary German people
Goatherds
Rip Van Winkle-type stories